The 1996–97 South Alabama Jaguars basketball team represented the University of South Alabama as members of the Sun Belt Conference during the 1996–97 NCAA Division I men's basketball season. The Jaguars were led by head coach Bill Musselman and played their home games at the Mitchell Center. They finished the season 23–7, 14–4 in Sun Belt play to finish in first place. They won the Sun Belt tournament to earn an automatic bid to the 1997 NCAA tournament as the 13 seed in the Southeast region. In the opening round, the Jaguars lost to eventual National champion Arizona.

Roster

Schedule and results

|-
!colspan=9 style=| Regular season

|-
!colspan=9 style=| Sun Belt Conference tournament

|-
!colspan=9 style=| NCAA tournament

References

South Alabama Jaguars men's basketball seasons
South Alabama
South Alabama
1996 in sports in Alabama
1997 in sports in Alabama